Aaptos nuda is a species of sea sponge belonging to the family Suberitidae. The species was described by Randolph Kirkpatrick in 1903.

References

Aaptos
Sponges described in 1903